The following is a list of Roman Catholic and Orthodox canonized saints and beatified people of Australia. The list includes all Catholic saints, blesseds, and Servants of God with Australian connections, either because they were of Australian origin and ethnicity, or because they travelled to Australia from their own homeland and became noted in their hagiography for their work in Australia and amongst the Australian people. A small number may have had no Australian connection in their lifetime, but have nonetheless become associated with Australia through the depositing of their relics in Australian religious houses.

Catholic Church

Saints

Mary Ellen MacKillop (Mary of the Cross) (1842 - 1909), Founder of the Sisters of Saint Joseph of the Sacred Heart of Jesus (New South Wales, Australia)
Declared Venerable: 13 June 1992
Beatified: 19 January 1995 by Pope John Paul II
Canonized: 17 October 2010 by Pope Benedict XVI

Blesseds
None since 17 October 2010

Venerables
None since 13 June 1992

Servants of God
 Caroline Jones Chisholm (1808-1877), Married Layperson of the Archdiocese of Canberra-Gourlburn (England, United Kingdom - New South Wales, Australia)
 Eileen Rosaline O'Connor (1892-1921), Founder of the Society of Our Lady's Nurses for the Poor (Melbourne, Australia - New South Wales, Australia)
 Mary Glowrey (Mary of the Sacred Heart) (1887-1957), Professed Religious of the Society of Jesus Mary Joseph (Victoria, Australia - Bayalu Seeme, India)
 Constance Helen Gladman (Mary Rosina) (1922-1964), Professed Religious of the Daughters of Our Lady of the Sacred Heart; Martyr (Koroit, Australia - East New Britain, Papua New Guinea)

Candidates for sainthood
 John Bede Polding (1794–1877), Professed Priest of the Benedictines (English Congregation); Archbishop of Sydney; Founder of the Sisters of the Good Samaritan (Liverpool, England – Sydney, Australia)
 Julian Tenison-Woods (1832-1889), Priest of the Archdiocese of Sydney; Cofounder of the Sisters of Saint Joseph of the Sacred Heart (London, England - Sydney, Australia)
 Angelo Ambrosoli (1824–1891), Priest of the Pontifical Institute for Foreign Missions (Salerno, Italy – New South Wales)
 Ellen Whitty (Mary Vincent) (1819 - 1892), Professed Religious of the Religious Sisters of Mary (Wexford, Ireland - Queensland, Australia)
 Charles O'Neill (1828–1900), Married Layperson of the Archdiocese of Sydney; Cofounder of the Society of Saint Vincent de Paul (Glasgow, Scotland – Sydney, Australia)
 Geraldine Gibbons (Scholastica) (1817–1901), Founder of the Sisters of the Good Samaritan (Kinsale, Ireland – New South Wales, Australia)
 Joseph Augustine [Giuseppe Agostino] Canali, (1841-1915), Priest of the Archdiocese of Brisbane (Rome, Italy - Queensland, Australia)
 David Bertram McCullagh (1911-1942) and Clifford Ambrose Brennan (1916-1942), Professed Priests of the Missionaries of the Sacred Heart; Martyrs (Australia - near Fuga Island, Cagayan, Philippines)
 Frederick Gerard Mannes (Augustinus) (1908-1942), John Clarence Roberts (John William) (1910-1942), and Francis Joseph Fitzgerald (Donatus Joseph) (1910-1942), Professed Religious' of the Marist Brothers of the Schools; Martyrs (Australia - Bougainville, Papua New Guinea)
 John Hawes (1876–1956), Priest of the Diocese of Geraldton and the Archdiocese of Nassau (Richmond, England – Florida, United States)
 Timothy Edward McGrath (1881-1977), Professed Priest of the Missionaries of the Sacred Heart; Founder of the Society of Our Lady's Nurses for the Poor (Victoria, Australia - New South Wales, Australia)
 Kevin Lawlor (1955–1986), Professed Religious of the Franciscan Friars Minor; Martyr (New South Wales, Australia – Soroti, Uganda)
 Irene McCormack (1938-1991), Professed Religious of the Sisters of Saint Joseph of the Sacred Heart; Martyr (Western Australia, Australia - Junín, Peru)
 Bartholomew Augustine Santamaria (1915-1998), Married Layperson of the Archdiocese of Melbourne (Victoria, Australia)
 John Billings (1918-2007) and Evelyn Livingston Billings (1918-2010), Married Laypersons of the Archdiocese of Melbourne (Victoria, Australia)
 Rosemary Goldie (1916-2010), Layperson of the Archdiocese of Sydney (New South Wales, Australia)
 Patrick Dougherty (1931-2010), Bishop of Bathurst (New South Wales, Australia)
 Paul Jackson (1937–2020), Professed Priest of the Jesuits (Queensland, Australia – Bihar, India)

Orthodox Church

Saint
 The Venerable Father Nikanor (Savić) of Athos, Australia and New Zealand was the Abbot of Hilandar before moving to Australia to pacify the schism (resulting from communism and its fall) between the Patriarchal Diocese and the New Gracanica Metropolitanate's Diocese. He reposed in 1990, was glorified by the Serbian Orthodox Church in 2010, and celebrated each year on March 4 (both calendars).

See also
 List of Saints from Oceania
 List of Anglo-Saxon saints
 List of saints of Ireland
 List of Cornish saints
 List of saints of Northumbria
 List of Breton saints
 List of Swedish Saints
 List of Russian saints
 List of saints of Poland
 List of Serbian saints
 List of American saints and beatified people
 List of Mexican saints
 List of Brazilian saints
 List of saints of the Canary Islands

References

Catholic Church in Australia
Australia
Saints
Saints